Lupinus arbustus is a species of lupine known by the common name longspur lupine. It is native to western North America from British Columbia to California to Utah, where it grows in several types of habitat, including sagebrush and forests. It is sometimes hairy in texture. The calyx of sepals around the base of the corolla has a knoblike spur at the back. The flower corolla is white to yellow to various shades of purple or pink. There are several subspecies.

External links
Jepson Manual Treatment
Photo gallery

arbustus
Flora of British Columbia
Flora of the Western United States
Flora without expected TNC conservation status